Elvaston may refer to 
Elvaston, Derbyshire in England
Elvaston, Illinois in the USA